Everdingen is a former municipality in the Netherlands. Together with Zijderveld and Hagestein, it had been part of Vianen municipality since 1986. Since 2019 it is a part of the municipality of Vijfheerenlanden. It enjoys a strategic position on the Lekdijk to the south of the river Lek. The eastern limits of Everdingen are marked by the Diefdijk, which also marks the municipal and provincial boundaries. Fort Everdingen was built nearby during the 19th century as a part of the Hollandse Waterlinie.

Everdingen was originally a town in the province of Gelderland but the boundary lines were redrawn in 1820 making it a part of South Holland.  It transferred from that province when it came under the municipality of Vianen. It is now in the province of Utrecht.

Everdingen was mentioned as early as 1284 when the big landowners of the area were invited by the Lord of Everdingen to discuss and agree to the maintenance of the dikes.

These days Everdingen is mostly known from traffic information because of the nearby motorway intersection and bottleneck on the motorways A2 and A27.

Gallery

References

Former municipalities of South Holland
Populated places in Utrecht (province)
Vijfheerenlanden